Nantahala School is a small K–12 school in Topton, North Carolina. It is located in a remote part of Macon County amidst the Nantahala National Forest. The school has about 100 students. It is one of the state's few remaining K–12 schools. The school is located at 213 Winding Stairs Road. It has an 11 percent minority enrollment and 61 percent of students are economically disadvantaged. The school has volleyball, cross country, basketball, and golf teams. Alumni include Eric Rudolph who dropped out of the school. The school is part of the North Carolina High School Athletic Association and its teams compete as the Nantahala Hawks.

See also
List of high schools in North Carolina

References

Schools in Macon County, North Carolina